Stockyard, Queensland may refer to:
 Stockyard, Queensland (Lockyer Valley), Australia
Stockyard, Queensland (Livingstone Shire), Australia